Domenico Ercole del Rio (c. 1718 – c. 1802) was an Italian lawyer and author.  He published a 110-page chess book in 1750 which was the basis of a work by Giambattista Lolli thirteen years later.  He composed many chess problems.  He was one of the Modenese Masters. He was known as "the Devil who could never be beaten".

See also
 Wrong bishop

References

External links
 "The anonymous Modenese", chess.com

1718 births
1802 deaths
Chess composers
Italian chess writers
Italian chess players
Place of birth missing